The 2011 ITF Men's Circuit is the 2011 edition of the third tier tour for men's professional tennis. It is organised by the International Tennis Federation and is a tier below the ATP Challenger Tour. During the months of July and September more than 179 tournaments were played with the majority being played in the month of August.

Key

July

August

September

References

 07-09